The 1953 Grand Prix motorcycle racing season was the fifth F.I.M. Road Racing World Championship Grand Prix season. The season consisted of nine Grand Prix races in five classes: 500cc, 350cc, 250cc, 125cc and Sidecars 500cc. It began on 12 June, with Isle of Man TT and ended with Spanish Grand Prix on 4 October.

1953 Grand Prix season calendar

† After pronouncing the track unsafe before practice had begun, all the factory teams withdrew from the 350cc and 500cc classes in the proposed German Grand Prix.  The event continued, but with the agreement that these two classes were only counted as an ordinary international event.

Standings

Scoring system
Points were awarded to the top six finishers in each race. Only the four best races counted in the Sidecars, 125cc and 250cc, while in the 350cc and 500cc championships, the five best results were counted.

500cc final standings

350cc Standings

250cc Standings

125cc Standings

References

 Büla, Maurice & Schertenleib, Jean-Claude (2001). Continental Circus 1949–2000. Chronosports S.A. 

Grand Prix motorcycle racing seasons
Grand Prix motorcycle racing season